John Ince may refer to:
John Ince (Australian politician) (c.1831–1897), member of the Victorian Legislative Assembly 1877 to 1880
John F. Ince, author and business journalist
John Ince (author), Canadian author, lawyer, entrepreneur and from 2005 to 2012 activist in the sex-positive movement
John Ince (actor) (1878–1947), American actor
John Ince (missionary), early British Protestant missionary
John Ince (footballer) (1908–19??), English football goalkeeper active in the 1930s